The Legend of Tashan Dorrsett is a remix album made by rapper Kool Keith. It was released on April 5, 2011 under the label Junkadelic.

Track listing
 "The Legend Of Tashan Dorrsett (Prelude)"
 "New Shit (feat. Champ) [DJ Junkaz Lou Remix]"
 "Supa Supreme (Marley Marl Remix)"
 "Flow Smooth (feat. Ced Gee) [DJ Junkaz Lou Remix]"
 "The Real Beginner (feat. Chem) [Ariel 'The Cartel' Caban Remix]"
 "Above The Sea Level (Agallah Remix)"
 "Tashan Dorrsett... (Domingo Remix)"
 "Track Runner (feat. Marc Live, Raaddrr Van & Tr Love) [Tr Love Remix]"
 "Glamour Life (feat. Marc Live) [DJ Junkaz Lou Remix]"
 "Booty Clap (feat. Big Sche Eastwood) [Mr. Sche Remix]"
 "Black Lagoon (Domingo Remix)"
 "Magnetic Junkadelic (DJ Junkaz Lou Remix)"

2011 albums
Kool Keith albums